Stow Creek may refer to:

Stow Creek (New Jersey), a tributary of Delaware Bay in southern New Jersey
Stow Creek Township, New Jersey, in Cumberland County
Stow Creek School District, in Cumberland County, New Jersey